Oscar Thomas Holter (born 26 February 1986) is a Swedish record producer and songwriter based in the United States. He is best known for his work with record producer and fellow Swede Max Martin and Canadian singer-songwriter the Weeknd on the 2019 single "Blinding Lights", which became the longest-charting song on the Billboard Hot 100 of all-time. Holter has written and produced songs with the likes of Katy Perry, Taylor Swift, MARINA, Tove Lo, Charli XCX, DNCE, Hailee Steinfeld, Carly Rae Jepsen, Cher Lloyd, Christina Aguilera, Adam Lambert, and Troye Sivan. He is also a former member of the EBM band Necro Facility.

Songwriting and production credits

References

Swedish record producers
Swedish songwriters
Living people
1986 births